Candace Migail Edwards (born 16 November 1988) is a Tobagonian footballer who played as a midfielder and a forward. She has been a member of the Trinidad and Tobago women's national team, and is record holding, two-time All-American collegiate player.

Early life
Edwards was raised in Mount Saint George, a suburb in Scarborough, Tobago.

College career
Edwards has attended the Young Harris College and the Shorter University in the United States.

Club career
Edwards has played for Tobago FC in Trinidad and Tobago.

International career
Edwards capped for Trinidad and Tobago at senior level during the 2010 Central American and Caribbean Games, the 2010 CONCACAF Women's World Cup Qualifying, the 2011 Pan American Games, the 2012 CONCACAF Women's Olympic Qualifying Tournament qualification and the 2014 Central American and Caribbean Games.

International goals
Scores and results list Trinidad and Tobago' goal tally first.

Subsequent Activities 
Candace Edwards formed a band , "THE PACES",  in 2018 with her husband Eric Pace. They have released two albums: "Parfait" in 2019 and "S.P.T" in 2020. In 2021 the duo was featured on Radiolab's "The Vanishing of Harry Pace" podcast episode 3. Edwards husband Eric is the Great-Grandson of musical pioneer Harry Pace.

References

1988 births
Living people
People from Tobago
Trinidad and Tobago women's footballers
Women's association football midfielders
Women's association football forwards
Young Harris Mountain Lions women's soccer players
Shorter Hawks athletes
College women's soccer players in the United States
Trinidad and Tobago women's international footballers
Competitors at the 2010 Central American and Caribbean Games
Pan American Games competitors for Trinidad and Tobago
Footballers at the 2011 Pan American Games
Trinidad and Tobago expatriate women's footballers
Trinidad and Tobago expatriate sportspeople in the United States
Expatriate women's soccer players in the United States